Ananthasagaram is a village and a Mandal in Nellore district in the state of Andhra Pradesh in India.

Geography  

It has a pond (cheruvu) :- Ananthasagaram AnanthasagaramCheruvu

Demographics 
As of 2011 census, the village had a population of 8,588. The total population constitute 4,436 males and 4,152 females. Average sex ratio of the village is 936 for per 1000.

References 

Villages in Nellore district